Anannya Top Ten Awards is the prize for women in Bangladesh recognition of contribution to the fields of agriculture, industrial, trade, economics, acting, music, sports, education, liberation war, social welfare and development-work-law, human rights, entrepreneur, politics and journalism. The award is being given since 1993.

History
The magazine is noted for its annual awards Anannya Top Ten Awards to outstanding women in Bangladesh since 1993. Anannya Magazine provided the Anannya Top Ten awards to individuals women for significant contributions to the development in specific sector. The magazine gives this award in recognition of her contribution to the fields of agriculture, industrial, trade, economics, acting, music, sports, education, liberation war, social welfare and development-work-law, human rights, entrepreneur, politics, and journalism. The winners are awarded crests of prizes.

Awards by year

References

Bangladeshi awards
Women in Bangladesh
Awards for contributions to society
Orders, decorations, and medals for women
Awards established in 1993